Ernakulam is a city in Kerala, India. It may also refer to:
 Ernakulam district, a district in Kerala
 Ernakulam (Lok Sabha constituency), a constituency in Kerala